Reiner Schilling (10 May 1943 – 15 October 2013) was a German wrestler. He competed in the men's freestyle featherweight at the 1964 Summer Olympics.

References

External links
 

1943 births
2013 deaths
German male sport wrestlers
Olympic wrestlers of the United Team of Germany
Wrestlers at the 1964 Summer Olympics
People from Tuttlingen
Sportspeople from Freiburg (region)